Tahj Jakins (born November 11, 1975 in Salt Lake City, Utah) is a retired American soccer defender who played five seasons in Major League Soccer.

Youth
Born in Utah, Jakins grew up in southern California, playing for the North Huntington Beach Futbol Club.  In 1993, he entered UCLA where he played on the school’s soccer team.  In 1996, he earned first team All American recognition.  That year, he also played in two games with the U.S. national B-Team, but was never called up to the senior national team.

Professional
On February 1, 1997, the Colorado Rapids selected Jakins with the first pick in the 1997 MLS College Draft.  He was a regular with the Rapids for three seasons.   In 2000, he played one game before being waived on April 7, 2000.  The Kansas City Wizards then signed  him.  He played two games for them that season, but spent several loan periods away from the team.  In 2000, he played for the MLS Pro-40 and Raleigh Capital Express of the USL A-League.  In 2001, he went on loan to the Pittsburgh Riverhounds.  The Wizards waived Jakins on November 17, 2001.  He may have also played for the Minnesota Thunder.

References

Living people
American soccer players
UCLA Bruins men's soccer players
Colorado Rapids players
Sporting Kansas City players
Pittsburgh Riverhounds SC players
Raleigh (Capital) Express players
1975 births
Major League Soccer players
Major League Soccer first-overall draft picks
MLS Pro-40 players
A-League (1995–2004) players
Soccer players from Utah
Colorado Rapids draft picks
All-American men's college soccer players
Association football defenders